"Stereo Hearts" is a song by American group Gym Class Heroes featuring Adam Levine of Maroon 5. The song was released on June 14, 2011, as the lead single from the group's fifth studio album, The Papercut Chronicles II.

Composition and recording
Produced by Benny Blanco and Robopop, "Stereo Hearts" begins with Adam Levine singing the hook. "My heart's a stereo / It beats for you, so listen close / Hear my thoughts in every note. / Make me your radio / Turn me up when you feel low / This melody was meant for you / So sing along to my stereo." The song is written in the key of F minor. McCoy then raps about serenading his ideal girl and picking love over animosity, all the while relaying the message using music-based metaphors. Additional Fender Rhodes was played by Austin Bis at Chalice Recording Studios in Los Angeles.

Music video
Gym Class Heroes drummer Matt McGinley explained that the song's music video "basically plays on the idea that we're sort of just being casual, hanging out, being ourselves and our shadows get wild and get loose. The video shows the band playing in the city of New York and their shadows are playing on the ground."

The video (directed by Hiro Murai) has the feel of a 1980s setting, with a breakdancer and several payphones seen, though the actual setting is modern as evidenced by the Mini Cooper in one scene. It prominently features a pawn shop with a stack of old-fashioned boomboxes and TV sets, on which Adam Levine appears when he is singing the chorus.

As of March 2023, the video has hit 700 Million views making it the 4th most viewed video on Fueled By Ramen.

Lyric video
A lyric video for the song received millions of views in the first month of its release. This is one of the first lyric videos to incorporate a live action story line, showing a man and a woman in split-screen as they get dressed for the day and go outdoors carrying boom-boxes, until they finally meet in a park. The video stars actress Breana McDow and was directed by music video director Djay Brawner.

Critical reception
The song received positive reviews. MTV's Jenna Hally Rubenstein complimented the band's new direction on "Stereo Hearts", writing that it is "a little more slickly produced than we're used to, but, we're still solidly behind the experimental new song." 
MTV's James Montgomery described it as a "prime-time slab of genre-mashing, sweat-inducing pop, the kind of song that may very well push GCH to summertime superstardom." 
Becky Bain of Idolator called it a "head-nodding jam" and "an instantly memorable signal that Gym Class is back in session."

Live performances
Travie McCoy joined Maroon 5 onstage to perform "Stereo Hearts" on Saturday Night Live on November 5, 2011. Gym Class Heroes and Adam Levine performed the song at the 2011 American Music Awards, along with Christina Aguilera for the Maroon 5 song "Moves like Jagger" on November 20, 2011. The duo continued with the song on The Ellen DeGeneres Show on November 23, 2011, and Pepsi Super Bowl Fan Jam, a pre-show of the Super Bowl XLVI on February 2, 2012.

Track listing
Digital download
 "Stereo Hearts (feat. Adam Levine)" – 3:31

German CD single
 "Stereo Hearts (feat. Adam Levine)" – 3:31
 "Stereo Hearts (feat. Adam Levine)" – Soul Seekers Retronica Extended Mix – 6:17

Remixes
 "Stereo Hearts (feat. Adam Levine)" – Dillon Francis Radio Edit — 3:36
 "Stereo Hearts (feat. Adam Levine)" – Soul Seekerz Retronica Radio Edit — 3:36
 "Stereo Hearts (feat. Adam Levine)" – Dillon Francis Extended Mix — 3:46
 "Stereo Hearts (feat. Adam Levine)" – Soul Seekerz Retronica Extended Mix — 6:17

Charts

Weekly charts

Year-end charts

All-time charts

Certifications

References

2011 singles
Adam Levine songs
Gym Class Heroes songs
Songs written by Ammar Malik
Songs written by Robopop
Songs written by Adam Levine
Songs written by Travie McCoy
Songs written by Sterling Fox
2011 songs
Alternative hip hop songs
Number-one singles in Israel